Asura distyi is a moth of the family Erebidae. It was described by Lars Kühne in 2007. It is found in Ghana.

References

Endemic fauna of Ghana
Moths described in 2007
distyi
Insects of West Africa
Moths of Africa